This is a list of water companies in the United States. For more information see water supply and sanitation in the United States.

Alabama
 Asbury Water Authority
 Autauga County Water Authority
 Autaugaville Water Authority
 Bakerhill Water Authority
 Bear Creek Water Works Board
 Beauregard Water Authority
 Bellwood Water And Fire Protection Authority
 Big Wills Water Authority
 Blount County Water Authority
 Boldo Water And Fire Protection Authority
 Buhl Elrod And Holman Water Authority
 Butler County Water Authority
 Calhoun County Water And Fire Protection Authority
 Canoe Water And Fire Protection Authority
 Carrolls Creek Water Authority
 Central Elmore County Water Authority
 Central Talladega County Water District
 Chandler Mountain-Greasy Cove Water Authority
 Chattahoochee Valley Water Supply District
 Cherokee County Water Authority
 Chilton Water Authority
 Chisholm Heights Water And Fire Protection Authority
 Choctaw Edna Water Authority
 Clarke Wilcox Monroe Water Authority
 Clay County Water Authority
 Cleburne County Water Authority
 Coaling Water Authority
 Coffee County Water Authority
 Coker Water Authority Inc
 Cook Springs Water Authority Inc
 Coosa Valley Water Supply District
 Covington County Water Authority
 Cowikee Water Authority
 Cumberland Mountain Water And Fire Protection Authority
 Curry Water Authority
 Dale County Water Authority
 Deer Park Vinegar Bend Water And Fire Protection Authority
 Dekalb Jackson Water Supply District
 Douglas Water And Fire Protection Authority
 East Lauderdale County Water And Fire Protection Authority
 Edwardsville Water And Fire Protection Authority
 Elmore Water Authority
 Fayette County Water Authority
 Fayetteville Water And Fire Protection Authority
 Five Star Water Supply District
 Fosters Ralph Water Authority
 Franklin County Water Service Authority
 Frankville Water And Fire Protection Authority
 Greenhill Water And Fire Protection Authority
 Hackneyville Water Authority
 Hale County Water Authority
 Hamden Ridge Water Authority
 Harrisburg Water Authority
 Harvest-Monrovia Water Authority
 Henry County Water Authority Inc
 Highland Water Authority
 Hollins Water Authority
 Houston County Water Authority
 Huguley Water Authority
 Huntsville Utilities
 Huxford Water And Fire Protection Authority
 Ida Station Water District
 Jackson's Gap Water Authority
 Joppa Hulaco And Ryan Water Authority
 Kushla Water District
 Lagrange Mountain Water Authority
 Lamar County Water And Fire Protection Authority
 Leroy Water Authority
 Limestone County Water And Sewer Authority
 Little Waxie Water Authority
 Loachapoka Water Authority
 Lowndes County Water Authority
 Lowndesboro Water Authority
 Lyeffion Water And Fire Protection Authority
 Macon County Water And Fire Protection Authority
 MCB Water And Fire Protection Authority
 Mcintosh Water And Fire Protection Authority
 Mid Central Water And Fire Protection Authority
 Millers Ferry Water Authority
 Millerville Water And Fire Protection Authority
 Montgomery Water Works and Sanitary Sewer Board
 Moulton Water Authority
 Mount Andrew Water Authority
 Mount Pleasant Battens Water Authority
 Munford Water And Fire Protection Authority
 New London Water Sewer And Fire Protection Authority
 North Baldwin Water Authority
 North Choctaw Water And Sewer Authority
 North Clarke Water Authority
 North Dallas Water Authority
 North Geneva County Water Authority
 North Jackson County Water Authority
 Northeast Alabama Water Authority
 Northeast Morgan County Water Authority
 Old Line Water Authority
 Old Suggsville Water And Fire Protection Authority
 Orange Beach Water Sewer And Fire Protection Authority
 Owassa And Brownville Waterworks And Fire Protection Authority
 Owens Cross Roads Water Authority
 Park City Water Authority
 Perdido Bay Water Sewer And Fire Protection Authority
 Perdido Water Service Authority
 Perry County Water Authority
 Peterson Water Authority
 Pickens County Water Authority
 Pike County Water Authority
 Pilgrim-Providence Water And Fire Protection Authority
 Pine Bluff Water Authority
 Pine Level Water Authority
 Pintlala Water And Fire Protection Authority
 Providence Water Authority
 Quint-Mar Water Authority
 Ray Water Authority
 Remlap-Pine Mountain Water And Fire Protection Authority
 Ridgeroad Water Authority
 Rockwood Water Authority
 Russell County Water Authority
 Saint Elmo Irvington Water Authority
 Sand Mountain Water Authority
 Sand Springs Water Authority
 Sellers Station Water And Fire Protection Authority
 Smiths Water And Sewer Authority
 Snowdoun Water And Fire Protection Authority
 South Bullock County Water Authority
 South Crenshaw Water Authority
 South Dallas Water Authority
 South Marengo County Water And Fire Protection Authority
 Southwest Alabama Water And Fire Protection Authority
 Spring Valley Water Authority
 Star-Mindingall Water Authority
 Stewartville Water Authority
 Sumter County Water Authority
 Tibbie Water And Fire Protection Authority
 Tillison Bend Water Authority
 Townley Water Authority
 Turnerville Water And Fire Protection Authority
 Twin Water Authority
 Upper Bear Creek Water Authority
 Wall Street Water Authority
 Walnut Hill Water Authority
 Walter Water Authority
 Warrior River Water Authority
 Washington County Water Authority
 Wattsville Water Authority
 West Autauga Water Authority
 West Barbour County Water And Fire Protection Authority
 West Clark Water Authority
 West Dallas County Water And Fire Protection Authority
 West Etowah County Water Authority
 West Lauderdale County Water And Fire Protection Authority
 West Morgan-East Lawrence Water And Sewer Authority
 Whorton Bend Water Authority
 Wolf Creek Water Sewer And Fire Protection Authority

Arizona
 Arizona Water Company
 Mohave County Water Authority
 Phoenix Water Services Department
 Pinal County Water Augmentation Authority
 Queen Creek Irrigation Water Delivery District 32
 Silverbell Irrigation District
 Thunderbird Water Delivery District 1
 Tucson Water

Arkansas
 Central Arkansas Water
Little Rock Water Reclamation Authority

California
 California American Water
 California Department of Water Resources
 California Water Service
 Castaic Water Agency
 Del Oro Water Company
 East Bay Municipal Utility District
 Escondido Utilities
 Fallbrook Public Utility District
 Fresno Irrigation District
 Kern Water Bank Authority
 Kings River Conservation District
 JG Boswell Company Water Department
 Long Beach Water Department
 Los Angeles Department of Water and Power
 Marin Water
 Mesa Water District
 Metropolitan Water District of Southern California
 Municipal Water District of Orange County
 Oceanside Water Utilities
 Orange County Water District
 Orange Cove Irrigation District
 Otay Water District
 Padre Dam Municipal Water District
 Panoche Water District
 San Diego County Water Authority
 San Diego Water Department
 San Francisco Public Utilities Commission
 SJW Group
 San Luis and Delta-Mendota Water Authority
 Santa Clara Valley Water District
 Santa Margarita Water District
 Semitropic Water Storage District
 Solano Irrigiation District
 South Mesa Water Company
 South Montebello Irrigation District
 Southwest Water company
 Sunnyslope Water company
 Tulare Lake Basin Water Storage District
 Tulare Lake Drainage District
 Turlock Irrigation District
 Vallecitos Water District
 Valley Center Municipal Water District
 Vista Irrigation District
 Walnut Valley Water District
 Western Heights Water Company
 Westlands Water District

Colorado
 Academy Water & Sanitation District
 Alpensee Water District
 Arapahoe Estates Water District
 Aurora Water
 Baca Grande Water & Sanitation District
 Bailey Water & Sanitation District
 Bancroft-Clover Water and Sanitation District
 Baseline Water District
 Bear Creek Water and Sanitation District
 Bennett Bear Creek Farms Water & Sanitation District
 Berkeley Water & Sanitation District
 Beulah Water Works District
 Blue Mountain Water District
 Bone Mesa Domestic Water District
 Bonvue Water & Sanitation District
 Bow Mar Water & Sanitation District
 Box Elder Water and Sanitation District
 Brook Forest Water District
 Brownsville Water and Sanitation District
 Buffalo Creek Water District
 Byers Water & Sanitation District
 Castleton Center Water and Sanitation District
 Castlewood Water and Sanitation District
 Centennial Water & Sanitation District
 Central Adams County Water & Sanitation District
 Central Weld County Water District
 Chatfield South Water District
 Cherry Creek Valley Water and Sanitation District
 Cherry Creek Village Water District
 Cherry Hills Heights Water & Sanitation District
 Chipeta Water District
 City of Fountain's Water Department
 Clear Creek Valley Water & Sanitation District
 Clifton Water District
 Colorado Springs Utilities
 Columbine Lake Water District
 Columbine Water and Sanitation District
 Cottonwood Water and Sanitation District
 Crestview Water and Sanitation District
 Crow Hill Water and Sanitation District
 Cucharas Sanitation & Water District
 Deer Creek Water District
 Denver Southeast Suburban Water & Sanitation District
 Diamond Ridge Water & Sanitation District
 Dominion Water & Sanitation District
 Donala Water and Sanitation District
 Eagle River Water & Sanitation District
 East Alamosa Water and Sanitation District
 East Boulder County Water District
 East Cherry Creek Valley Water & Sanitation District
 East Dillon Water District
 East Larimer County Water District
 Florissant Water & Sanitation District
 Forest View Acres Water District
 Fort Collins-Loveland Water District
 Garden Valley Water and Sanitation District
 Genesee Water & Sanitation District
 Granby Silver Creek Water and Wastewater Authority
 Grand County Water and Sanitation District No. 1
 Green Mountain Water and Sanitation District
 Greenwood Plaza Water District
 Havana Water and Sanitation District
 Hazeltine Heights Water and Sanitation District
 Heeney Water District
 High View Water District
 Highland Lakes Water District
 Hi-Line Water and Sanitation District
 Hillcrest Water and Sanitation District
 Himalaya Water and Sanitation District
 Holly Hills Water and Sanitation District
 Hoover Hill Water & Sanitation District
 Idledale Water and Sanitation District
 Indian Hills Water District
 Inverness Water and Sanitation District
 Ken Caryl West Ranch Water District
 Ken-Caryl Ranch Water & Sanitation District
 Kittredge Sanitation and Water District
 Lakehurst Water & Sanitation District
 Lakeview Estates Water District
 Left Hand Water District
 Little Thompson Water District
 Longs Peak Water District
 Lookout Mountain Water District
 Mansfield Heights Water & Sanitation District
 Meadowbrook Water District
 Mesa Cortina Water and Sanitation District
 Mesa Water & Sanitation District
 Miller Ranch Water & Sanitation District
 Montezuma County Water District #1
 Morgan County Quality Water District
 Morrison Creek Metropolitan Water & Sanitation District
 Mountain View Villages Water and Sanitation District
 Mountain Water and Sanitation District
 Mt Crested Butte Water & Sanitation District
 Mt. Werner Water and Sanitation District
 Navajo Western Water District
 North Carter Lake Water District
 North Lincoln Water and Sanitation District
 North Pecos Water & Sanitation District
 North Shore Water District
 North Table Mountain Water and Sanitation District
 North Weld County Water District
 Northern Colorado Water Conservancy District
 Northern Douglas County Water and Sanitation District
 Northgate Water District
 Olde Stage Water District
 Pagosa Area Water and Sanitation District
 Park Center Water District
 Park Forest Water District
 Parker Water and Sanitation District
 Parkville Water District
 Penrose Water District
 Pinewood Springs Water District
 Pioneer Lookout Water District
 Platte Canyon Water and Sanitation District
 Pleasant View Water and Sanitation District
 Rainbow Valley Water District
 Ralston Valley Water and Sanitation District
 Red Hawk Ranch Water & Sanitation District
 Redstone Water and Sanitation District
 Resource Colorado Water and Sanitation MD
 Ridgewood Water District
 Roaring Fork Water & Sanitation District
 Rock Creek Mesa Water District
 Round Mountain Water and Sanitation District
 Roxborough Water and Sanitation District
 Rural Water Authority of Douglas County
 Security Water District
 Sedalia Water and Sanitation District
 Shannon Water and Sanitation District
 Silver Heights Water & Sanitation
 SilverCreek Water & Sanitation District
 Snake River Water District
 Snowmass Water & Sanitation District
 Somerset Domestic Waterworks District
 South Adams County Water & Sanitation District
 South Evergreen Water District
 South Fork Water and Sanitation District
 South Sheridan Water, Sanitary Sewer & Storm Drain
 South-East Englewood Water District
 Southwest Metropolitan Water and Sanitation District
 Southwest Suburban Denver Water and Sanitation District
 Spring Canyon Water & Sanitation District
 St. Mary's Glacier Water and Sanitation District
 Steamboat Lake Water and Sanitation District
 Strasburg Sanitation and Water District
 Stratmoor Hills Water District
 Tabernash Meadows Water & Sanitation District
 Teller County Water & Sanitation District #1
 Timber Creek Water District
 Timbers Water and Sanitation District
 Tri-County Water Conservancy District
 Turkey Canon Ranch Water District
 United Water & Sanitation District
 Upper Bear Creek Water and Sanitation District
 Upper Big Sandy Ground Water Management District
 Valley at Winter Park Water District
 Valley Water District
 West Fort Collins Water District
 Westcreek Lake Water District
 Westwood Lakes Water District
 Wheat Ridge Water District
 Widefield Water and Sanitation District
 Willowbrook Water & Sanitation District
 Willows Water District
 Winter Park Ranch Water and Sanitation District
 Winter Park Water & Sanitation District
 Woodmoor Water and Sanitation District No. 1

Connecticut
 Metropolitan District Commission (Hartford area)
 Regional Water Authority (New Haven area)
 Aquarion Water Company (Fairfield, New Haven, Hartford, Litchfield, Middlesex and New London Counties)

Delaware
Lewes Board of Public Works
Middlesex Water Company
Municipal Services Commission of the City of New Castle
Wilmington Department of Public Works

District of Columbia
 D.C. Water and Sewer Authority (DCWASA)
 Washington Aqueduct (wholesale)

Florida
 Aqua America - Florida
 Gainesville Regional Utilities
 Hialeah Department of Water and Sewers
 JEA (formerly Jacksonville Electric Authority)
 Miami-Dade Water and Sewer Department
 Miami-Petersburg Department of Water and Sewers
 Orlando Utilities Commission
 St. Petersburg Water Resources Department
Tampa Bay Water

Georgia
 City of Atlanta Department of Watershed Management 
 Cherokee County Water & Sewerage Authority
 City of Austell Water System
 City of Canton Water System
 City of Mountain Park Water System
 City of Powder Springs Water System
 City of Smyrna Water System
 City of Woodstock Water System
 Cobb County - Marietta Water Authority
 Cobb County Water System
 Columbus Water Works
 Douglasville/Douglas County Water Authority
 Etowah Water and Sewer Authority
 Gwinnett County Department of Water Resources
 Gilmer County Water Authority
 Heard County Water Authority
 Jackson County Water and Sewerage Authority
 Macon Water Authority
 Marietta Board of Lights and Water
 Paulding County Water System
 Pickens County Water Authority
 Upper Oconee Basin Water Authority
 Waleska Water Authority

Hawaii
 Hawaii American Water

Illinois
 Aqua America - Illinois
 Aurora Department of Public Works
 Axton Environmental
 Chicago Department of Water Management
 Illinois American Water
 Rockford Department of Public Works

Indiana
 Aqua America  - Indiana
 Indiana American Water
 Indianapolis Water

Iowa
 Des Moines Water Works
 Iowa American Water

Kansas
 Kansas City Board of Public Utilities
 WaterOne

Kentucky
 Kentucky American Water
Louisville Water Company
Owensboro Municipal Utilities
 Martin County Water District
 Prestonsburg City Utilities
 Paintsville City Utilities
 Louisa City Water 
 Southern Water District
 Salyersville Water Works
 Mountain Water District
 Frankfort Plant Board
 Big Sandy Water District
 Rattlesnake Ridge Water District
 City of Ashland Water Department

Louisiana
 Baton Rouge Water Company
 City of Bogalusa
 City of Monroe
 Jefferson Parish Water Department
 Sewerage and Water Board of New Orleans
 Shreveport Office of Water and Sewerage

Maine
 Aqua America - Maine
 Maine Water - Owned by Connecticut Water
 Portland Water District (Greater Portland area)

Maryland
 Anne Arundel County Department of Public Works
 Baltimore Bureau of Water and Wastewater (serves City of Baltimore and Baltimore County)
 Easton Utilities
 Maryland American Water
 Washington Suburban Sanitary Commission (Montgomery County and Prince George's County)

Massachusetts
 Boston Water and Sewer Commission
 Cambridge Water Department
 Holyoke Water Works
 KWI North America
 Lynn Water and Sewer Commission
 Massachusetts Water Resources Authority (wholesale)

Michigan
Detroit Water and Sewerage Department
Grand Rapids Water System 
Great Lakes Water Authority
Holland Board of Public Works
Lansing Board of Water and Light
Michigan American Water

Minnesota
 Minneapolis Water Department
 Saint Paul Regional Water Services

Mississippi
 Jackson Department of Public Works

Missouri
 Aqua America - Missouri
 City Utilities of Springfield
 Missouri American Water
 St. Louis Water Division

Nebraska
 Metropolitan Utilities District (Omaha Metro Area)

New Hampshire
 Pennichuck Corporation (central and southern NH)

New Jersey
 Aqua America - New Jersey
 Atlantic City Municipal Utilities Authority
 East Windsor Municipal Utilities Authority
 Freehold Township Water And Sewer
 Middlesex Water Company
 New Jersey American Water
 Newark Department of Water and Sewer Utilities
 Ocean County Municipal Utilities Authority
 Passaic Valley Water Commission
 Trenton Water Works
 United Water

New York
 American Water (Long Island)
 Aqua America - New York
 Brick Township Municipal Utility Authority
 Buffalo Water Authority
 Lakewood Township Municipal Utilities Authority
 New York City Department of Environmental Protection
 Rochester Bureau of Water and Lighting
 Syracuse Water Department
 Yonkers Department of Public Works

North Carolina
 Aqua America - North Carolina
 Cape Fear Public Utility Authority (Wilmington-New Hanover County)
 Charlotte Water
 Durham Public Works Department
 Greensboro Water Resources Department
 Orange Water and Sewer Authority (OWASA)
 Raleigh Public Utilities Department
 Winston-Salem/Forsyth County Utilities Division

Ohio
 Akron Public Utilities Bureau
 Aqua America - Ohio
 Cleveland Division of Water
 Columbus Department of Public Utilities
 Del-Co Water Company
 Greater Cincinnati Water Works
 Ohio American Water
 Toledo Department of Public Utilities

Oklahoma
 Oklahoma City Department of Utilities

Oregon
 Portland Water Bureau

Pennsylvania
 Aqua Pennsylvania
 Borough of Kutztown Water Department
 Borough of Quakertown Water Department
 Borough of Schuylkill Haven Utilities Department
 City of Bethlehem Department of Water & Sewer Resources
 Doylestown Borough Water Department
 Ephrata Area Joint Authority
 Erie Water Works
 Horsham Water and Sewer Authority
 North Penn Water Authority
 North Wales Water Authority
 Pennsylvania American Water
 Philadelphia Water Department
 Pittsburgh Water and Sewer Authority
 South Middleton Municipal Authority
 Warminster Municipal Authority

South Carolina
 Aqua America - South Carolina
 Beaufort-Jasper Water and Sewer Authority (BJWSA)
 Charleston Water System
City of Columbia Water
 Greenville Water
Spartanburg Water

Tennessee
 Tennessee American Water

Texas
 Aqua America - Texas
 Austin Water
 Clear Lake City Water Authority
 Corpus Christi Water Department
 Dallas Water Utilities
 El Paso Water Utilities
 Fort Worth Water Department
Greater Texoma Utility Authority
 Houston Water
North Texas Municipal Water District
 San Antonio Water System
Tarrant Regional Water District
 Texas American Water
The Trinity River Authority of Texas

Utah
 Salt Lake City Department of Public Utilities
 Washington County Water Conservancy District

Vermont
 Burlington Department of Public Works

Virginia
 Aqua America - Virginia
 City of Fairfax Utilities [Fairfax City]
 City of Falls Church Department of Public Works (serves Falls Church and east-central Fairfax County)
 City of Manassas Utilities (also wholesale)
 Fairfax County Water Authority (most of Fairfax County, major wholesaler to surrounding areas)
 Loudoun Water (formerly Loudoun County Sanitation Authority), serves the unincorporated areas of Loudoun County
 Prince William County Service Authority (most of Prince William County except Dale City)
 Town of Leesburg Water
 Town of Purcellville Water
 Virginia American Water Company (Alexandria, Dale City and Hopewell)

Washington
 Cascade Water Alliance
 Seattle Public Utilities
 Snohomish County Public Utility District (PUD)
 Tacoma Water division of Tacoma Public Utilities

West Virginia
 West Virginia American Water
 Kermit Water Works
 Fort Gay Water Works
 Logan Water Works
 Gilbert Water Department

Wisconsin
 Madison Water Utility
 Milwaukee Water Works

See also 
 List of public utilities

Water companies, List of United States
United States